Derek Bard (born June 14, 1995) is an American professional golfer. 

Bard was born in New Hartford, New York and played college golf at the University of Virginia. He currently resides in Jacksonville Beach, Florida.

Bard finished runner-up to Bryson DeChambeau at the 2015 U.S. Amateur, thus earning an invitation to the 2016 Masters Tournament and the 2016 U.S. Open.

Bard missed the cut at the Masters by three shots, shooting rounds of 76-77, 9-over-par.

Amateur wins (5)
2014 U.S. Collegiate
2015 Sunnehanna Amateur, U.S. Collegiate
2017 Cleveland Golf Palmetto Invite, Monroe Invitational

Source:

Results in major championships

CUT = missed the half-way cut

U.S. national team appearances
Arnold Palmer Cup: 2016

References

American male golfers
Virginia Cavaliers men's golfers
People from New Hartford, New York
1995 births
Living people